Johann Abraham Peter Schulz (31 March 1747, Lüneburg – 10 June 1800, Schwedt) was a German musician. He is best known as the composer of the melody for Matthias Claudius's poems "Der Mond ist aufgegangen" and "Wir pflügen und wir streuen", and the Christmas carol "Ihr Kinderlein kommet".

Life
Schulz attended St. Michaelis school in Lüneburg from 1757 to 1759 and then the Johanneum there from 1759 to 1764. In 1765, he was the student in Berlin of composer Johann Kirnberger, and then taught in Berlin himself. In 1768 Kirnberger recommended Schulz for the position of music teacher and accompanist to the Polish Princess Sapieha Woiwodin von Smolensk. Schulz traveled with her for 3 years throughout Europe, where he came into contact with many new musical ideas. He served as the conductor of the French Theatre in Berlin from 1776 to 1780 and from 1780 to 1787 he was the Kapellmeister of Prince Henry in Rheinsberg. Schulz then went on to serve as Court Kapellmeister in Copenhagen from 1787 to 1795 before returning to Berlin.

Schulz wrote operas, stage music, oratorios, and cantatas, as well as piano pieces and folk songs; he also wrote articles on music theory for Johann Georg Sulzer's (1720–1779) Allgemeine Theorie der schönen Künste in four volumes.

Selected works

For piano

Sechs Klavierstücke, Op. 1, 1778
Sonata, Op. 2, 1778

Lieder
Gesänge im Volkston, 1779
Lieder im Volkston, 1782, 1785, 1790.
Chansons Italiennes, 1782

Operas
Clarissa, operetta, Berlin 1775
La fée Urgèle, comédie avec ariettes, 1782
Aline, reine de Golconde, Rheinsberg 1787
Høstgildet, Syngespil, Copenhagen 1790
Indtoget, Syngespil, Copenhagen 1793
Peters bryllup, Syngespil, Copenhagen 1793

Incidental music
Music for Athalie by Jean Racine, Rheinsberg 1785

Church music
Maria und Johannes, 1788
Kristi død, 1792
Des Erlösers letzte Stunde, 1794
4 Hymns, 1791–1794

Further media

Notes

References
Portions of the biographical information in this article are based on a translation of its German equivalent.

External links
 
 
 
 Cyber Hymnal: Johann Abraham Peter Schulz
 
  
 Schulz' church music 
 

1747 births
1800 deaths
People from Lüneburg
German Classical-period composers
German opera composers
Male opera composers
German conductors (music)
German male conductors (music)
German music theorists
18th-century classical composers
18th-century conductors (music)
German male classical composers
Pupils of Johann Kirnberger
18th-century German composers
18th-century German male musicians